Blair is both a surname and given name.

Blair may also refer to:

Places
In the Andaman and Nicobar Islands
 Port Blair, the capital of the Andaman and Nicobar Islands

In Australia:
 Division of Blair, an electoral district in the Australian House of Representatives, in Queensland

In Canada:
 Blair Road, a major road in Ottawa
 Blair, Ontario, a village in Cambridge, Regional Municipality of Waterloo, Ontario
 
In Malaysia
 Blair's Harbour, or Blair Harbour

In the United States:
 Blair, Kansas
 Blair, Maryland, fictional locale in the 1999 film Blair Witch Project
 Blair, Nebraska
 Blair, Nevada
 Blair, Oklahoma
 Blair, Tennessee
 Blair, Wisconsin
 Blair, Jefferson County, West Virginia
 Blair, Logan County, West Virginia
 Blair County, Pennsylvania
 Blair Township, Clay County, Illinois
 Blair Township, Michigan
 Blair Township, Pennsylvania

Other
 Blair Academy, a private high school in Blairstown, New Jersey, United States
 Blair Corporation, American mail-order retailer of clothing and home products
 Blair (publisher), an American nonprofit publisher
 Blair Road, a major north–south artery in Ottawa, Canada
 Blair Station (OC Transpo), a transit station of Ottawa's OC Transpo public transit network

See also
 Blair's Sauces and Snacks, a United States snack company founded in 1989
 Blair Athol (disambiguation)
 Blair Atholl, a town in Perth and Kinross, Scotland
Blair Castle, a castle in that town
 Blair's Cove, in Durrus, County Cork, Ireland
 Blair House, the residence of Harry Truman during his term of presidency in the United States
 Blair toilet, a form of long-drop developed in Zimbabwe for use in rural communities
 The Blair Witch Project, a horror film
 Montgomery Blair High School, Silver Spring, Maryland, United States
 Justice Blair (disambiguation)